Stylocheilus longicauda is a species of gastropods belonging to the family Aplysiidae.

The species is found in Caribbean, Indian and Pacific Ocean.

References

Aplysiidae
Gastropods described in 1825